Codiocarpus is a genus of flowering plants belonging to the family Stemonuraceae.

Its native range is Tropical Asia.

Species:

Codiocarpus andamanicus 
Codiocarpus merrittii

References

Stemonuraceae
Asterid genera